Maria Anna of Bavaria (18 December 1574 – 8 March 1616) was a German princess, a member of the House of Wittelsbach by birth and an Archduchess consort of Inner Austria by marriage.

Born in Munich, she was the fourth child and second (but eldest surviving) daughter of William V, Duke of Bavaria and Renata of Lorraine.

Life 
On 23 April 1600, Maria Anna married her first cousin Ferdinand, Archduke of Inner Austria at Graz Cathedral. This marriage reaffirmed the alliance between the House of Habsburg and House of Wittelsbach. Without interfering in politics, Maria Anna lived in her husband's shadow. She gave him seven children, five of whom lived to adulthood. 

Maria Anna died in Graz aged 41, three years before the coronation of her husband as King of Bohemia and King of Hungary and his elevation to Holy Roman Emperor, so she was never a Holy Roman Empress. She was buried in the Mausoleum near the Cathedral, Graz.

Issue
 Archduchess Christine (25 May 1601 – 12/21 June 1601), died in infancy.
 Archduke Charles (born and died 25 May 1603).
 Archduke John-Charles (1 November 1605 – 28 December 1619), died unmarried.
 Ferdinand III (13 July 1608 – 2 April 1657), Holy Roman Emperor, King of Hungary and Bohemia, who married:
 Maria Anna of Spain in 1631 
 Maria Leopoldine of Austria in 1648 
 Eleanor Gonzaga in 1651 
 Archduchess Maria Anna (13 January 1610 – 25 September 1665), who was married on 15 July 1635 to Maximilian I, Elector of Bavaria (her uncle).
 Archduchess Cecilia Renata (16 July 1611 – 24 March 1644), who was married on 9 August 1637 to Wladyslaw IV, King of Poland (her cousin).
 Archduke Leopold Wilhelm (6 January 1614 – 20 November 1662), Bishop of Passau and Strasbourg (1625–37), Olmütz (1637–55), Breslau (1655–62), Governor of the Spanish Netherlands (1647–56), Grand Master of the Teutonic Order (1641–62). He died unmarried.

Ancestry

Notes

References
 Constantin von Wurzbach:  Habsburg, Maria Anna von Bayern in: Biographisches Lexikon des Kaiserthums Oesterreich, vol 7, ed L. C. Zamarski, Vienna 1861, p. 23 on-line [retrieved 8 April 2015].
 Hellmut Andics: Die Frauen der Habsburger. Heyne, Munich 1997.
 Richard Reifenscheid: Die Habsburger in Lebensbildern. Piper, 2007.

1574 births
1616 deaths
Duchesses of Bavaria
House of Wittelsbach
Austrian royal consorts
Austrian princesses
Daughters of monarchs